Kenneth Lorin Darby (May 13, 1909 – January 24, 1992) was an American composer, vocal arranger, lyricist, and conductor. His film scores were recognized by the awarding of three Academy Awards and one Grammy Award. He provided vocals for the Munchkinland mayor in The Wizard of Oz (1939), who was portrayed in the film by Charlie Becker. Darby is also notable as the author of The Brownstone House of Nero Wolfe (1983), a biography of the home of Rex Stout's fictional detective.

Personal life 
Kenneth Lorin Darby was born in Hebron, Nebraska, on May 13, 1909, to Lorin Edward Darby and Clara Alice Powell. Darby was married to Vera Matson from 1932 to his death in 1992.

Career 
Ken Darby's choral group, The Ken Darby Singers, sang backup for Bing Crosby on the original 1942 Decca Records studio recording of "White Christmas." In 1940 they also sang on the first album ever made of the songs from The Wizard of Oz, a film on which Darby had worked. However, the album was a studio cast recording, not a true soundtrack album (although it did feature Judy Garland), and it did not use the film's original arrangements.

Darby also performed as part of "The King's Men," a vocal quartet who recorded several songs with Paul Whiteman's orchestra in the mid 1930s and were the featured vocalists on the Fibber McGee and Molly radio program from 1940 through 1953. In the early 1940s, he performed with the King's Men a musical version of "A Visit from St. Nicholas" that he wrote called "T'was the Night Before Christmas" that was performed on the Christmas episodes of Fibber McGee and Molly. They also participated on the soundtracks of several MGM films, including The Wizard of Oz and occasional Tom and Jerry cartoons.  The King's Men portrayed the Marx Brothers in a musical spoof in the film Honolulu (Darby played one of two 'Grouchos' in the group). He also provided the theme song and the soundtrack for The Life and Legend of Wyatt Earp, the 1955-61 television series starring Hugh O'Brian, and The Adventures of Jim Bowie starring Scott Forbes.

He was a composer and production supervisor for Walt Disney Studios and was choral and vocal director on the 1946 Disney film classic Song of the South.

He was also Marilyn Monroe's vocal coach for Gentlemen Prefer Blondes (1953) and There's No Business Like Show Business (1954).

Darby was also the principal composer of the 1956 Elvis Presley hit "Love Me Tender" for the movie of the same name but signed the rights over to his wife, Vera Matson, whose name appears as co-lyricist and co-composer with Presley. The song was adapted from the Civil War-era song "Aura Lee."  Presley's composing credit was mandated by his management, to entice him to record the song.  Darby was often asked about his decision to credit the song to his wife along with Presley, and his standard response was an acid, "Because she didn't write it either."

An avid fan of Nero Wolfe, Rex Stout's fictional detective genius, Darby wrote a detailed biography of Wolfe's home titled The Brownstone House of Nero Wolfe (1983).

Ken Darby died January 24, 1992, in the final stages of production of his last book, Hollywood Holyland: The Filming and Scoring of 'The Greatest Story Ever Told'  (1992).

He was buried at the Forest Lawn, Hollywood Hills Cemetery in Los Angeles.

Awards

Academy Awards 
 1956, Winner, Best Scoring of a Musical PictureThe King and I(shared with Alfred Newman)Academy of Motion Picture Arts and Sciences
 1958, Nominee, Best Scoring of a Musical PictureSouth Pacific(shared with Alfred Newman)Academy of Motion Picture Arts and Sciences
 1959, Winner, Best Scoring of a Musical PicturePorgy and Bess(shared with André Previn)Academy of Motion Picture Arts and Sciences
 1961, Nominee, Best Scoring of a Musical PictureFlower Drum Song(shared with Alfred Newman)Academy of Motion Picture Arts and Sciences
 1963, Nominee, Best Original Music ScoreHow the West Was Won(shared with Alfred Newman)Academy of Motion Picture Arts and Sciences
 1967, Winner, Best Score – Adaptation or TreatmentCamelot(shared with Alfred Newman)Academy of Motion Picture Arts and Sciences

Grammy Awards 
 1960, Winner, Best Soundtrack Album, Original Cast, Movie or TelevisionPorgy and Bess(shared with André Previn)National Academy of Recording Arts and Sciences

References

External links 
 performs "All The Cats Join In" with the Billy Mills Orchestra on a live 1946 broadcast of NBC's Fibber McGee and Molly show restored in high fidelity on YouTube.
 
 Ken Darby Centennial Tribute
 Ken Darby Lifetime Achievement Award
 Obituary in The New York Times (January 26, 1992)

1909 births
1992 deaths
People from Hebron, Nebraska
20th Century Studios people
American film score composers
American male film score composers
Animated film score composers
Best Original Music Score Academy Award winners
Grammy Award winners
MGM Records artists
Songwriters from Nebraska
Walt Disney Animation Studios people
Warner Records artists
Burials at Forest Lawn Memorial Park (Hollywood Hills)
20th-century American writers
20th-century American composers
20th-century American male writers
20th-century American male musicians